The molecular formula C17H36 (molar mass: 240.27 g/mol, exact mass: 240.2817 u) may refer to:

 3,3-Di-tert-butyl-2,2,4,4-tetramethylpentane
 Heptadecane

Molecular formulas